The Patriot Parliament is the name given to the Irish Parliament called by James II during the 1689 to 1691 war in Ireland. The first since 1666, it held only one session, from 7 May 1689 to 20 July 1689. 

The Commons was 70 members short since there were no elections in Fermanagh and Donegal, while its members were overwhelmingly Old English and Catholic. Sir Richard Nagle was elected Speaker while the Lords was led by Baron Fitton; it contained five Protestant peers and four Church of Ireland bishops, including Anthony Dopping, Bishop of Meath, who acted as leader of the opposition.

Members of the Lords
Fitton spent much of his adult life in prison for criminal libel; allegedly selected by James because he was a Protestant, he promptly converted to Catholicism. It included five Protestant peers, Granard, Longford, Barrymore, Howth and Rosse, who was Tyrconnell's son-in-law, plus four Church of Ireland bishops; Anthony Dopping, Bishop of Meath, acted as leader of the opposition.

The members of the House of Lords are as follows:

Members of the Commons
The House was 70 members short, since no elections were held in the northern provinces of Fermanagh and Donegal. Six members were Protestant, the remaining 224 Catholic, a minority being Gaelic or 'Old Irish', while the majority were from the Old English Catholic elite. The Speaker or leader was Sir Richard Nagle, a wealthy Catholic lawyer and close ally of Tyrconnell.

References

Sources

External links

Historical Irish legislatures
1689 in Ireland
Parliament of Ireland
Parliaments

689
17th-century elections in Ireland
1689